Norton City Schools may refer to:
Norton City Schools (Ohio)
Norton City Schools (Virginia)